Richland Creek is a  long 2nd order tributary to Crabtree Creek in Raleigh, North Carolina that rises in a pond on the North Carolina State Fairgrounds.  The creek then flows north across I-40 and through Schenck Forest to eventually join Crabtree Creek.  The watershed is mainly developed with about 30% of it forested.

Course
Richland Creek rises in a pond on the North Carolina State Fairgrounds and then flows north across I-40 and through Schenck Forest to join Crabtree Creek. The watershed is about 30% forested.

Watershed
Reedy Creek drains  of area and is underlaid by the Raleigh terrane geologic formation.  The watershed receives an average of 46.3 in/year of precipitation and has a wetness index of 407.29.

See also
List of rivers of North Carolina

External links
 Schenck Forest
 Carolina Outdoors Guide (Schenck Forest)
 Inside the Carl Schenck Memorial Forest

References

Rivers of North Carolina
Rivers of Wake County, North Carolina
Tributaries of Pamlico Sound